The NBA All-Star Legends Game (also called the Legends Classic) was an NBA Legends game from 1984 to 1993 that featured retired players. It was held during the NBA All-Star Weekend and consisted of two teams, East and West. The NBA cancelled the NBA Legends Classic after 1994 due to the players' frequent injuries from the game in part due to the large range in fitness levels among younger and older alumni (During the 1992 game, Norm Nixon and David Thompson both received injuries playing in the game). The Shooting Stars Competition and Rising Stars Challenge are largely considered its replacements.

Previously, in 1957 and 1964, there were two NBA Old-Timers Games.

References

http://www.allstarnba.es/legends.htm

National Basketball Association All-Star Game
Recurring sporting events established in 1984
Recurring sporting events disestablished in 1993